The Liberty First Credit Union Arena, formerly known as Ralston Arena and sometimes as Ralston Sports and Event Center, is an arena located in Ralston, Nebraska, a suburb of Omaha.  It serves as the home of the Omaha Lancers of the United States Hockey League and the Omaha Beef of Champions Indoor Football. It was home to the Omaha Mavericks NCAA Division I men's basketball team, representing the University of Nebraska Omaha, from its opening until the end of the 2014–15 season. The school opened Baxter Arena for the 2015–16 season.

It was the location of the VEX Robotics Nationals competition in 2013. The Omaha Heart, an expansion team of the Legends Football League, was announced on April 19, 2012. In October 2015, the Ralston Arena was a venue for the Women's Flat Track Derby Association Division 1 roller derby Playoffs, hosted by local league, the Omaha Rollergirls.

The arena sold the naming rights to Liberty First Credit Union on a ten-year agreement and Ralston Arena was renamed on January 1, 2022.

Photo gallery

References

External links
 Liberty First Credit Union Arena

 

Buildings and structures in Douglas County, Nebraska
Defunct college basketball venues in the United States
Indoor arenas in Nebraska
Indoor ice hockey venues in the United States
Omaha Mavericks men's basketball
Sports venues completed in 2012
2012 establishments in Nebraska
Sports venues in Nebraska
Sports venues in Omaha metro area
Basketball venues in Nebraska